Kohar is a 1991 Pakistani television series written by Haseena Moin which was directed and produced by Zaheer Khan.

Synopsis 
Story revolves around a motherless educated young girl with her well-to-do father and her grandmother who brings her up. Her father loves his daughter and he has not married again, but as he is a terribly busy person. His sensitive daughter feels neglected. A young boy returned from abroad in search of his roots falls in love with the girl and wanted to marry her, but due to some misunderstanding return back without marrying her.

Cast 
 Shakeel as Azhar
 Marina Khan as Shamin
 Frieha Altaf as Neelam
 Junaid Butt as Shehroz
 Fauzia Wahab as Aapa Begum
 Jamshed Ansari as Ali
 Hina Owais as Rani

Production

Casting 
Fauzia Wahab previously rejected some scripts from other dramas and it was the debut serial of her after she accepted the script after she was encouraged by her husband.

References

External links
 

1990s Pakistani television series
Pakistan Television Corporation original programming
Pakistani drama television series
Pakistani family television dramas
Urdu-language television shows